Legislative elections to elect members of the Cisleithanian Imperial Council were held in the Czech lands over several days in June and July 1911.
The Czech lands (Kingdom of Bohemia, Margraviate of Moravia and the Duchy of Upper and Lower Silesia) elected 194 out of the 516 seats in the Imperial Council.

This was the second election under universal male suffrage and it was won by the Czechoslavonic Agrarian Party (the German Agrarian Party was also successful). Czech National Social Party and other German nationalist parties also gained support; by contrast the election meant losses for Catholic parties.

The election was the last before the dissolution of the empire as a result of World War I. In 1918, the election result was used as a key to the composition of the Revolutionary National Assembly, the provisional parliament of Czechoslovakia up to the 1920 election.

Results

See also 
1911 Cisleithanian legislative election

References

1911 elections in Europe
1911
1911 in Austria-Hungary
June 1911 events